The 1924 USSR Chess Championship was the third edition of USSR Chess Championship. Held from 23 August to 15 September in Moscow. The tournament was won by Efim Bogoljubow.

Table and results

References 

USSR Chess Championships
Championship
Chess
1924 in chess
1924 in the Soviet Union
Chess